The Forests Now Declaration is a declaration that advocates using carbon credits to protect tropical forests. The Declaration was created by the Global Canopy Programme, and has been signed by over 200 NGOs, business leaders, scientists and conservationists. The Declaration was created as carbon credits from land use, land-use change and forestry were omitted from the Clean Development Mechanism for the First Commitment Period of the Kyoto Protocol despite contributing 18–25% of all emissions.

Rationale
Deforestation in the next five years will release more carbon dioxide than all aircraft since the Wright Brothers until at least 2025; however, credits from reduced deforestation were omitted from the Clean Development Mechanism for the first commitment period of the Kyoto Protocol, so there is little incentive for forested countries to reduce their deforestation rates. The Forests NOW declaration seeks to establish new market based mechanisms to protect the ecosystem services that forests provide in biodiversity conservation, carbon sequestration and global and local hydrological and mineral cycles.

Prescriptions
The Declaration prescribes six changes to the existing carbon market frameworks:
 Ensure that carbon credits for reduced emissions from deforestation and degradation (REDD) and the protection of standing forests are included in all national and international carbon markets, especially those created by the UN Framework Convention on Climate Change.
 Simplify and expand carbon market rules, including the Clean Development Mechanism, to encourage reforestation, afforestation and sustainable forest management.
 Include tropical forest and land use carbon credits in the European Union Emissions Trading Scheme, while maintaining strong incentives to reduce industrial emissions.
 Encourage mechanisms that recognise the value of carbon stocks and forest ecosystem services, and support appropriate voluntary carbon market standards.
 Provide assistance for developing nations to build capacity to fully participate in the carbon markets, and to evaluate the ecosystem services their forests provide.
 Incentivize the sustainable use of degraded land and ecosystems, and remove incentives that encourage forest destruction.

Signatories

Over 200 individuals and organisations have signed the declaration including:

Organisations 
 Coalition for Rainforest Nations
 Conservation International
 Flora and Fauna International
 The Forest Trust
 Wildlife Conservation Society
 Union of Concerned Scientists

Individuals 
 Hans Blix
 Jane Goodall
 Wangari Maathai

References

External links 
 The Forests NOW blog The Original
 Forests in the Fight Against Climate Change, a report by the Global Canopy Initiative

Carbon finance
World forestry
Forest conservation